Ice Castles is a  soundtrack album contains music from the 1978 romantic drama film Ice Castles. It was nominated for Best Album of Original Score Written for a Motion Picture or Television Special at the 22nd Annual Grammy Awards. "Through the Eyes of Love", performed by Melissa Manchester, was nominated for a Golden Globe and for the Academy Award for Best Original Song at the 52nd Academy Awards.

Track listing
All songs composed, conducted and produced by Marvin Hamlisch, unless otherwise noted.

References

1979 soundtrack albums
1970s film soundtrack albums